Anzhela Gasparian (born 27 August 1996) is a Russian judoka.

She participated at the 2018 World Judo Championships, winning a medal. In 2021, she competed in the women's +78 kg event at the 2021 World Judo Championships held in Budapest, Hungary.

References

External links
 

1996 births
Living people
Russian female judoka
Universiade bronze medalists for Russia
Universiade medalists in judo
Medalists at the 2017 Summer Universiade
21st-century Russian women